Tariq Aziz (28 April 1936 – 5 June 2015) was an Iraqi politician who served as Deputy Prime Minister, Minister of Foreign Affairs and a close advisor of President Saddam Hussein. Their association began in the 1950s when both were activists for the then-banned Arab Socialist Ba'ath Party. He was both an Arab nationalist and a member of the Chaldean Catholic Church.

Because of security concerns, Saddam rarely left Iraq, so Aziz would often represent Iraq at high-level diplomatic summits. What the United States wanted, he averred, was not "regime change" in Iraq but rather "region change". He said that the Bush Administration's reasons for war were "oil and Israel."

After surrendering to American forces on 24 April 2003, Aziz was held in prison, first by American forces and subsequently by the Iraqi government, in Camp Cropper in western Baghdad. He was acquitted of some charges on 1 March 2009 following a trial, but was sentenced to 15 years on 11 March 2009 for the executions of 42 merchants found guilty of profiteering in 1992 and another 7 years for relocating Kurds.

On 26 October 2010, he was sentenced to death by the Iraqi High Tribunal, which sparked regional and international condemnation from Iraqi bishops and other Iraqis, the Vatican, the United Nations, the European Union and the human rights organization Amnesty International, as well as various governments around the world, such as Russia. On 28 October 2010, it was reported that Aziz, as well as 25 fellow prison inmates, had begun a hunger strike to protest the fact that they could not receive their once-monthly visit from friends and relatives, which was normally set for the last Friday of each month.

Iraqi President Jalal Talabani declared that he would not sign Aziz's execution order, thus commuting his sentence to indefinite imprisonment. Aziz remained in custody the rest of his life and died of a heart attack in the city of Nasiriyah on 5 June 2015, aged 79.

Early life and education 

Mikhail Yuhanna  was born on 28 April 1936, in Tel Keppe, northern Iraq, to a Christian Assyrian family. He studied English at Baghdad University and later worked as a journalist, before joining the Ba'ath Party in 1957. He changed his distinctly Christian name in Syriac to the more Arabic sounding Tariq Aziz to gain acceptance by the Arab and Muslim majority. In 1963, he was editor of the newspaper Al-Jamahir and Al-Thawra, the newspaper of the Ba'ath party.

Political career

He began to rise through the ranks of Iraqi politics after the Ba'ath party came to power in 1968. Aziz became close to Saddam Hussein who heavily promoted him. He served as a member of the Regional Command, the Ba'ath Party's highest governing organization from 1974 to 1977, and in 1977 became a member of Saddam's Revolutionary Command Council.

In 1979, Aziz became Deputy Prime Minister of Iraq, and worked as a diplomat to explain Iraq's policies to the world. In April 1980 he survived an Iranian-backed assassination attempt carried out by members of the Islamic Dawa Party. In the attack, members of Islamic Dawa Party threw a grenade at Aziz in central Baghdad. The attack killed several people. This incident formed part of the casus belli of the Iran–Iraq War.

When Iraq invaded Kuwait in 1990, Aziz served as the international spokesman in support of the military action. He claimed the invasion was justified because Kuwait's increased oil production was harming Iraqi oil revenues. He condemned Arab states for "subservience to the United States' hegemony in the Middle East and their support for punitive sanctions." On 9 January 1991, Aziz was involved in the Geneva Peace Conference which included the United States Secretary of State, James Baker. The goal of the meeting was to discuss a possible resolution to the occupation of Kuwait.

Iraq war
In October 2000, the then-junior Minister for Foreign Affairs from Britain, Peter Hain, set up a secret war avoidance team to carry messages back and forth between himself and Aziz.  After initial cooperation, Aziz rebuffed the delegations.

On 14 February 2003, Aziz reportedly had an audience with Pope John Paul II and other officials in Vatican City, where, according to a Vatican statement, he communicated "the wish of the Iraqi government to co-operate with the international community, notably on disarmament". The same statement said that the Pope "insisted on the necessity for Iraq to faithfully respect and give concrete commitments to resolutions of the United Nations Security Council, which is the guarantor of international law".

Weapons of mass destruction

Shortly after the invasion of Iraq, President George W. Bush claimed Aziz as one of the Iraqi regime who was responsible for hiding Iraqi WMD:

Detention
He voluntarily surrendered to American forces on 24 April 2003, after negotiations had been mediated by his son. His chief concern at the time was for the welfare of his family. At the time of his surrender, Aziz was ranked number 43 out of 55 in the American list of most-wanted Iraqis despite a belief "he probably would not know answers to questions like where weapons of mass destruction may be hidden and where Saddam Hussein might be."

Before the war, Aziz claimed he would rather die than be a U.S. prisoner of war: "Do you expect me, after all my history as a militant and as one of the Iraqi leaders, to go to an American prison – to go to Guantanamo? I would rather die", he told Britain's ITV.

Defense witness
On 24 May 2006, Aziz testified in Baghdad as a defence witness for Ibrahim Barzan and Mukhabarat employees, claiming that they did not have any role in the 1982 Dujail crackdown. He stated that the arrests were in response to the assassination attempt on Saddam Hussein, which was carried out by the Shiite Dawa Party. "If the head of state comes under attack, the state is required by law to take action. If the suspects are caught with weapons, it's only natural they should be arrested and put on trial".

He further testified that the Dujail attack was "part of a series of attacks and assassination attempts by this group, including against me." He said that in 1980, Dawa Party insurgents threw a grenade at him as he visited a Baghdad university, killing civilians around him. "I'm a victim of a criminal act conducted by this party, which is in power right now. So put it on trial. Its leader was the prime minister and his deputy is the prime minister right now and they killed innocent Iraqis in 1980," he said. The Dawa Party is now a party in the Shiite coalition that dominates the Iraqi government. The party's leader, Ibrahim al-Jaafari, was prime minister until mid-May, when another leading Dawa Party figure, Nouri al-Maliki, was picked and he was able to form a new government before the end of May 2006.

In his closing remarks, he stated that "Saddam is my colleague and comrade for decades, and Barzan is my brother and my friend and he is not responsible for Dujail's events."

Imprisonment
On 29 May 2005, the British newspaper The Observer published letters (in Arabic and English) from Aziz written in April and May 2005, while he was in American custody, addressed to "world public opinion" pleading for international help to end "his dire situation":

In August 2005, Aziz's family was allowed to visit him. At the time the location of Aziz's prison was undisclosed; his family was transported in a bus with blackened out windows.

For security reasons he was later moved to Camp Cropper, part of the huge US base surrounding Baghdad airport. His son said that while his father was in poor health, he was being well treated by prison officials.  He could make 30 minutes of telephone calls monthly and had access to US Arabic-language radio and television stations. Every two months his family could send a parcel containing clothes, cigarettes, chocolate, coffee and magazines.

The spiritual leader of Iraq's Chaldean Catholic community, Emmanuel III Delly, called for Aziz's release in his 2007 Christmas message. Aziz was acquitted of crimes against humanity.

On 17 January 2010, Aziz suffered a stroke and was transferred from prison to hospital. On 5 August 2010, The Guardian released his first face-to-face interview since his surrender. On 22 September 2010, documents were released that he had given an interview about how he had told the FBI that the dictator Hussein was "delighted" in the 1998 terrorist bombings of two U.S. embassies in East Africa but had no interest in partnering with Osama bin Laden.

Trial
Aziz was set to appear before the Iraqi High Tribunal set up by the Iraq Interim Government, but was not brought up on any charges until April 2008. This changed when, on 29 April 2008, Aziz went on trial over the deaths of a group of 42 merchants who were executed by the Iraqi regime in 1992, after the merchants had been charged by the Iraqi regime with manipulating food prices when Iraq was under international sanctions.

The charges brought against Aziz were reported by The Independent to be "surprising" as the deaths of the 42 merchants had always previously been attributed to Saddam Hussein. Nevertheless, on 11 March 2009 the Iraqi High Tribunal ruled that Aziz was guilty of crimes against humanity, and he was sentenced to 15 years in prison. On 2 August 2009, Aziz was convicted by the Iraqi High Tribunal of helping to plan the forced displacement of Kurds from northeastern Iraq and sentenced to seven years in jail. After these judgments had been passed, BBC News stated that "there was no evidence that a Western court would regard as compelling that he had anything like final responsibility for the carrying out of the executions" of the 42 merchants and "there was no real evidence of his personal involvement and guilt" with regards to the displacement of Kurds. That same year, he was acquitted in a separate trial which concerned the suppression of an uprising in Baghdad during the 1990s.

On 26 October 2010, the Iraqi High Tribunal handed down a death sentence against Aziz for the offense of "persecution of Islamic parties," amongst them the serving Prime Minister Nouri al-Maliki's Islamic Dawa Party, following a crackdown on a Shia uprising after the 1991 Gulf War. The Associated Press reports that "the judge gave no details of Aziz's specific role" in the crackdown. His lawyer stated that Aziz's role in the former Iraqi government was in the arena of "Iraq's diplomatic and political relations only, and had nothing to do with the executions and purges carried during Hussein's reign." His lawyer further stated that the death sentence itself was politically motivated and that timing of the death sentence may have been aimed at diverting international attention away from documents released by WikiLeaks, which detailed crimes in which Maliki government officials have been implicated. His lawyers had 30 days to lodge an appeal, following which the court would have another 30 days to look into the appeal; if the appeal is turned down the sentence would be carried out after another 30 days. On 26 October 2010 the Vatican urged the Iraqi government not to carry out his execution, and European Union foreign policy chief Catherine Ashton stated that Aziz's execution would be "unacceptable and the EU will seek to commute his sentence." That same day, the human rights organization Amnesty International issued a statement condemning the use of the death penalty in this case, as well as for the cases of two other former Iraqi officials; the statement also expressed concern regarding the manner in which trials may have been conducted by the Iraqi High Tribunal. On 27 October 2010, Greek President Karolos Papoulias and the Russian Foreign Ministry both released statements urging the Iraqi government not to carry out the death penalty against Aziz. Also on 27 October 2010, a spokesperson for United Nations Secretary General Ban Ki-Moon was reported to have "stressed that the UN is against the death sentence and in this case, as in all others, it is calling for the verdict to be cancelled." On 28 October 2010, it was reported that some Iraqi Bishops and many ordinary Iraqis also condemned the death penalty for Aziz. Furthermore, according to The Wall Street Journal, "several international human-rights groups have criticised the procedures and questioned the impartiality of the court."

According to Agence France-Presse (AFP), his family stated that Aziz, along with 25 fellow inmates, had been on a hunger strike following the sentence to protest the denial of their once-monthly visits with family and friends, but an Iraqi court official has denied this. According to AFP, Aziz and the other prisoners were "still at the site of the court in Baghdad’s Green Zone and had not been transferred back to prison where they could have received their monthly visit."

On 17 November 2010, it was reported that Iraqi President Jalal Talabani had declared that he would not sign Aziz's execution order. On 5 December 2011, Saad Yousif al-Muttalibi, an adviser to the Prime Minister, had claimed the execution of Aziz would "definitely take place" after the withdrawal of American forces.

Family
In 2001, his son Ziad was arrested for corruption. In January 1999, Ziad was accused by his former mistress of using the official position of his father (mostly his cars) to facilitate smooth crossing of the Jordanian border with contraband, attempted murder of her husband and family, as well as for corruption involving French and Indonesian companies. He was arrested and sentenced to 22 years in prison. Aziz resigned from his post but Saddam did not accept his resignation. Ziad was eventually released from prison when Saddam decided that Aziz had paid enough for his mistakes.

Ziad Aziz now lives in Jordan with his wife, four children, and Tariq Aziz's two sisters. Tariq Aziz's wife and another son live in Jordan.

Death
Tariq Aziz died on 5 June 2015 in al-Hussein hospital in the city of Nasiriyah, at the age of 79. According to his lawyer, he was being treated well in prison but suffered from ill health and simply wanted an end to his "misery". The incarcerated Aziz suffered from depression, diabetes, heart disease, and ulcers. Aziz's daughter, Zeinab, claimed his body was stolen at Baghdad International Airport en route to Jordan by unidentified men on 11 June, but it was recovered the day after. Jordanian authorities said the body had not been stolen, but merely delayed until the relevant paperwork was filled out. Aziz was buried in Madaba.

References

External links

 Tariq Aziz faces US questions, bbc.co.uk, 25 April 2003
 Tariq Aziz Profile, bbc.co.uk, 11 October 2002
Interview with PBS
 

1936 births
2015 deaths
Members of the Regional Command of the Arab Socialist Ba'ath Party – Iraq Region
Most-wanted Iraqi playing cards
Disease-related deaths in Iraq
Foreign ministers of Iraq
Iraqi Arab nationalists
Chaldean Catholics
Iraqi diplomats
Iraqi Eastern Catholics
Iraqi people of the Iran–Iraq War
People from Tel Keppe
People of the 1991 uprisings in Iraq
University of Baghdad alumni
Iraqi prisoners sentenced to death
Prisoners sentenced to death by Iraq
Articles containing video clips
Prisoners who died in Iraqi detention
Iraq War prisoners of war
Iraqi prisoners of war